The Grey Sisters of the Immaculate Conception is a congregation of Roman Catholic sisters founded in 1926 in Pembroke, Ontario, Canada. It is dedicated to following the tradition of St. Marie-Marguerite d'Youville, and has established a number of international ministries that offer services in the areas of health, education,  pastoral care, and social and environmental advocacy.

The first international ministry established by the Grey Sisters was founded in China in 1929, working closely with the Canadian missionaries of the Scarboro Foreign Mission Society. In 1951, ministries were established in Japan and the Dominican Republic.   In 1960, they founded a ministry in the Bahamas, and most recently in Ireland and Thailand in 1998.

See also
Grey Nuns

References

1926 establishments in Ontario
Christian organizations based in Canada
Catholic female orders and societies
Christian organizations established in 1926
Pembroke, Ontario
Catholic Church in Canada